The Vampire may refer to:

 The Vampire (novella), a Gothic novella by Aleksey Konstantinovich Tolstoy
 "The Vampyre", an 1819 short story or novella by John William Polidori
 The Vampire (play), an 1820 drama by James Planché
 The Vampire (1957 film), a black and white 1957 horror film
 The Vampire (1915 film)
 The Vampire (1913 film)
 El vampiro (The Vampire), a 1957 Mexican horror film
 Le Vampire (The Vampire), an inverted roller coaster at La Ronde amusement park in Montreal, Quebec, Canada

See also
 Vampire (disambiguation)